The Traveling Awareness Bears is a non-profit organization focused on pediatric diseases, disorders, medical disciplines and genetic diseases programs. The organization's purpose is to help children with pediatric diseases to “not feel like they are alone in their fight.” The organization has specific stuffed bears for specific diseases that they send around the country with a passport and a journal, which emphasizes that the children fighting rare pediatric illnesses have other children that are just like them. Each bear is individualized pertaining to whichever disease it represents.  There are currently over 50 medical conditions with over 150 bears traveling the world.

Origin 

Elijah Rutherford and his mother, Jennifer Rutherford, founded Traveling Awareness Bears in 2012  but the unofficial organization started much earlier than that. When he was 20 months old, Elijah was diagnosed with stroke in the utero.  When he was seven, Elijah started to send around stuffed bears with a shirt that said “Pediatric Stroke Awareness” to other kids diagnosed with stroke. His mother says that he did this because Elijah felt that there was not enough awareness on pediatric illnesses besides cancer. The organization started on a Facebook page titled “Pediatric Stroke Awareness”. It started with only one bear individualized to Pediatric Stroke but increased to many other diseases.

Bears 

The Traveling Bears Awareness Organization has bears to represent a multitude of diseases including the following: Adrenal insufficiency, Adult Stroke, Apraxia of Speech, Arthritis, BAHA, Blood Disorder, CDKL5, Cerebral Cavernous Malformation, Cerebral palsy, CHARGE Syndrome, Chiari Malformation, Cochlear implant, Celiac or Coeliac disease, Congenital Adrenal Hyperplasia, Congenital heart defect, Cortical blindness, Cystic Fibrosis, Diabetes, Down Syndrome, Dysphasia, EA/TEF, Epilepsy, Enlarged Vestibular Aqueduct Syndrome, feeding tube, fatty oxidation disorder, Glutaric Aciduria, hearing impairment, Hemispherectomy, Hydrocephalus, Leukodystrophy, Lissencephaly, Lymphatic Malformation, Lymphoedema, Mental illness, Microcepahly, Microtia, Mitochondrial disease, mother sensory neuropathy, Neurofibromatosis, Noonan syndrome, Osteogenisis Imperecta, stroke, Perthes disease, Pierre-Robin syndrome, premature birth, chromosome disorder, retinopathy of prematurity, sensory processing disorder, Spina bifida, Tourette's Syndrome, traumatic brain injury, Trisomy syndrome, veloPharyngeal insufficiency, and William syndrome. Some bears are not for specific diseases but support for children and doctors. These include a bear for bullying and bears for nurses and doctors. The organization works to add more bears as requests come in. 
Each bear has a specific name, disease, and shirt. Some bears are specialized with crutches, masks, hearing aids, and other components of the specific diseases that they represent.

Blog 

Traveling Awareness Bears runs a blog which tracks the bears and shares the stories of the children they “visit”. Each blog post usually includes a picture of the child, the bear, and an activity that they did. Each post tells about what each child did with their specific bear. Each bear visits a child for one week at a time.

Publicity and Sponsors 

Associations such as CHASA (Children's Hemiplegia and Stroke Association) and Build-a-Bear donate to the organization. There are articles in newspapers across the country about the Traveling Awareness Bears and the children that they visit. The organization has been in many newspaper and online articles around the world including the North Jersey newspaper The Traveling Awareness Bears hold events to raise money and awareness to their organization. These events are featured on the Wantagh-Seaford page online which also explains the origin of the organization. Many children are said to be affected by these bears. Many articles are written in local newspapers about these children and the bears that 'visit' them.  These newspapers span from California to New York. The organization is also featured on other global organizations and projects such as The Global Gene Project.

References 

Non-profit organizations based in Missouri
Children's health-related organizations